Uga Carlini is a South African film director, writer and producer. She is best known for her work on the documentary film, Alison, music video, 17 Shots and feature film, Angeliena.

Life and career
Carlini was born in Pretoria, Gauteng and studied at Stellenbosch University. Her mother is South African and her father is of Italian descent. She is the co-founder of the production company, Towerkop Creations in 2010, which supports female driven stories. Her debut documentary short film, Good Planets Are Hard to Find, about Elizabeth Klarer. In 2016, she directed the feature documentary, Alison, based on the Marianne Thamm book, I Have Life, premiered at the Dances with Films Festival. She has also directed the music videos 17 shots, Die Deur, Wildste Oomblik and Beauty of Africa for the Sony Music Africa.

Carlini's debut feature film, Angeliena, about a formerly homeless parking attendant, released worldwide Netflix on October 8, 2021.

Personal life
Carlini has two sons, Roka and Neo, both made their acting debuts together on the feature film, Angeliena.

Filmography

Awards and nominations

References

External links
 
 

South African documentary filmmakers
South African women film directors
Women documentary filmmakers
Living people
Year of birth missing (living people)
Stellenbosch University alumni